François Vanden Eynde or Van Den Eynde (born 15 February 1911) was a Belgian footballer who played as a forward.

Born in Saint-Gilles, Brussels, he spent his career with his Royale Union Saint-Gilloise from 1930 to 1947. He won the Belgian First Division in 1933, 1934 and 1935, with the team going 60 matches unbeaten. He played 286 matches and scored 126 goals in the Belgian First Division.

Vanden Eynde earned four international caps for Belgium. His debut was on 11 December 1932, in a 6–1 friendly home loss to Austria. His only international goals came on 25 February 1934, when he came on as a 34th-minute substitute for Stanley Vanden Eynde and scored twice in a 4–4 draw against the Irish Free State at Dalymount Park, Dublin, in the 1934 FIFA World Cup qualification.

Vanden Eynde later became the coach of Union SG. In Autumn 1964 he coached the Brussels-based club in their last European appearance before a 58-year long absence, a 1-0 defeat to Italian side Juventus in the 1964–65 Inter-Cities Fairs Cup. He coached Union SG for one season.

Honours
Union SG
 Belgian First Division: 1932–33, 1933–34, 1934–35

References

External links
 

1911 births
People from Saint-Gilles, Belgium
Association football forwards
Belgian footballers
Belgium international footballers
Belgian Pro League players
Belgian Pro League managers
Year of death missing
Belgian football managers
Royale Union Saint-Gilloise players
Footballers from Brussels